Vladimir Pavlovich Petrov (born 20 March 1940) is a retired Soviet football player and a Russian coach.

Honours
 Soviet Top League winner: 1962, 1969.
 Soviet Cup winner: 1965.

International career

Petrov made his debut for USSR on August 17, 1960 in a friendly against East Germany.

External links
  Profile

1940 births
Living people
Soviet footballers
Soviet Union international footballers
Soviet football managers
Russian football managers
FC Spartak Moscow players
Soviet Top League players
Russian footballers
FC Shinnik Yaroslavl managers
FC Anzhi Makhachkala managers
FC Tobol Kurgan managers
Association football defenders